David Steinhart is an American singer-songwriter and guitarist, best known for the bands Pop Art, Smart Brown Handbag, and the Furious Seasons. He has been active in the Los Angeles pop scene since the 1980s.

Career 
Steinhart has been a staple of the Los Angeles indie pop scene since the 1980s. His career spans 30 years and over 20 releases.

He founded the band Pop Art in 1984 with his brothers, Jeff and Richard, and bassist Tony Ortega. Other players such as keyboardist Lyn Norton, drummers Steven Weisburd and his cousin, Steve LePatner, contributed to the band's albums over the years. Pop Art was active for 6 years and released 5 records.

After Pop Art disbanded, Steinhart released two solo albums before starting Smart Brown Handbag in 1993.   Smart Brown Handbag included Norton, Cindy Albon, Steinhart's brother Jeff on bass, and John ‘Slim’ Glogovac on drums and percussion. SBH was active until 2006 and released 10 full-length albums.

Steinhart has been active in the Furious Seasons since 2008. Band members have included Jeff Steinhart (bass), Paul Nelson (guitar/vocals), Bob Gannon (drums/percussion), Eric Marin (keyboards), Nate Steinhart (guitars) and Ray Chang (violin/guitar/vocals). In late 2015, after the release of My Love is Strong, the band changed their focus to modern folk music. The band became an acoustic trio consisting of Steinhart and Nelson on acoustic guitar and vocals, and Jeff Steinhart on standup bass. The trio perform in the Los Angeles area, and has played shows with John Hiatt and David Lindley. Look West, the band's fifth album, was released in September 2016. It was Steinhart's first entirely acoustic studio album. The Furious Seasons have released 5 full-length albums and are still active and continue to record. In May 2017, the Furious Seasons released the single "We All Belong", a folk style protest song.

Steinhart's music has also been used in television and films.

Musical style and reception 
Music magazine the Big Takeover describes Steinhart's musical style as “soft, finely crafted, windswept pop,” commenting that Steinhart sings and writes, “warm, literate, sober, preoccupied folk pop, always well-crafted, and full of small, conspicuous, workmanlike extras (pacific strings, mellotron, piano, guitar tweets, a southern blues harmonica), [with an] aptitude for unpretentious, poppy hooks.”

Steinhart's music is often understated and driven by his distinct vocals, which critics have called a “privilege of craftsmanship”. His voice is noted for its range and has been called “soaring... redemptive... at once world-weary and angelic”, “cynical and charming at the same time.” The Arizona Daily Star labeled Steinhart's vocals in Pop Art, “clear, crisp, and angst-driven.”

Steinhart composes songs about relationships and heartbreak, earning him a reputation as “especially adept at chronicling complicated reunions with faded flames.” LA Weekly wrote that, “For anyone who needs a little reassurance about that thing called love (or has had it with whiny dirges on the radio), Smart Brown Handbag's ouch-that-hurts anti-luv songs, harmonies, bouncy bass lines, and-peppy rock-style riffing are just what the therapist ordered,” praising Steinhart's honesty in his lyrics.

Rolling Stone commended Smart Brown Handbag's The Big Sigh, writing that "Smart Brown Handbags catchy guitar pop has been rumored to be on the edge of greatness for a long time and we believe the hype." The Orange County Register defined SBH's sound as, “early R.E.M jangle-pop with Johnny Marr guitars and slightly, off-kilter Paul Weller-influenced vocals.”

Discography

Solo

Pop Art

Smart Brown Handbag

Furious Seasons

References 

American male singer-songwriters
American singer-songwriters
American record producers
Living people
Year of birth missing (living people)